Cyrtaspis tuberculata is a species of European bush crickets belonging to the subfamily Meconematinae; no subspecies are listed in the Catalogue of Life.

This species is found in the Iberian Peninsula; belonging to the tribe Meconematini it has been called the warty oak bush-cricket.

References

Tettigoniidae
Orthoptera of Europe
Insects described in 2006